Richard Wood (died 1682) was a Welsh politician who sat in the House of Commons  from 1646 to 1648.

Wood was the son of Owen Wood of Rhosmor.  In 1646, he was elected Member of Parliament for Anglesey in the Long Parliament. He was appointed High Sheriff of Anglesey on 21 January 1656.

Wood married Catherine Bulkeley, daughter of Thomas Bulkeley, 1st Viscount Bulkeley on 22 October 1655. They had no family.

References

Year of birth missing
1682 deaths
Members of the Parliament of England (pre-1707) for constituencies in Wales
High Sheriffs of Anglesey
English MPs 1640–1648